Anna Potokina (born 18 June 1987) is a Russian professional racing cyclist, who currently rides for UCI Women's Continental Team .

Major results

2011
 10th Overall Tour de Bretagne Féminin
1st Stage 4
2012
 2nd Road race, National Road Championships
 10th Overall Tour of Adygeya
2013
 6th Overall Vuelta Internacional Femenina a Costa Rica
2015
 1st  Road race, National Road Championships
 7th Overall Tour Cycliste Féminin International de l'Ardèche
 8th Overall Tour of Adygeya
 8th Grand Prix of Maykop
 8th Giro del Trentino Alto Adige-Südtirol
2016
 9th Overall Giro del Trentino Alto Adige-Südtirol
2017
 5th Ljubljana–Domžale–Ljubljana TT
2018
 2nd Road race, National Road Championships
 4th Overall Tour of Zhoushan Island
2019
 3rd Road race, National Road Championships

See also
 List of 2015 UCI Women's Teams and riders

References

External links
 
 

1987 births
Living people
Russian female cyclists
Place of birth missing (living people)
21st-century Russian women